The United States ambassador to Israel is the official representative of the president of the United States to the head of state of Israel.

Until 1948 the area that is now the state of Israel had been under British administration as part of the League of Nations/United Nations British Mandate for Palestine. On May 14, 1948, the British government unilaterally terminated the mandate. On the same day, the Jewish Agency, under future Prime Minister David Ben-Gurion, declared independence and named the country Israel. The United States immediately recognized the nation and moved to establish diplomatic relations. The first U.S. ambassador commissioned to Israel was James Grover McDonald, who presented his credentials to the government of Israel on March 28, 1949. The ambassador holds the title Ambassador Extraordinary and Plenipotentiary.

The embassy of the United States in Israel is located at 14 David Flusser Street in Jerusalem.

Ambassadors and chiefs of mission

List source:

Notes

See also
Embassy of the United States, Jerusalem
Israel - United States relations
Foreign relations of Israel
Ambassadors of the United States

References
United States Department of State: Background notes on Israel

External links
 United States Department of State: Chiefs of Mission for Israel
 United States Department of State: Israel
 United States Embassy in Jerusalem

 
Israel
United States